Mohammad Hafifi bin Mansor (born 28 October 1990) is a Malaysian professional weightlifter. He won the gold medal in the men's 69 kg event at the 2014 Commonwealth Games. He also won the bronze medal at the 2010 Commonwealth Games in the 69 kg event.
Tested positive for drugs in 2017.

Major competitions

References

External links

Mohd Hafifi Bin Mansor - Tag Archive - Sports247.My

1990 births
Living people
Malaysian people of Malay descent
Malaysian male weightlifters
Olympic weightlifters of Malaysia
Weightlifters at the 2016 Summer Olympics
Commonwealth Games gold medallists for Malaysia
Weightlifters at the 2014 Commonwealth Games
Commonwealth Games bronze medallists for Malaysia
Commonwealth Games medallists in weightlifting
Weightlifters at the 2010 Commonwealth Games
20th-century Malaysian people
21st-century Malaysian people
Medallists at the 2010 Commonwealth Games
Medallists at the 2014 Commonwealth Games